Takakuma Dam  is a gravity dam located in Kagoshima Prefecture in Japan. The dam is used for irrigation. The catchment area of the dam is 38.4 km2. The dam impounds about 104  ha of land when full and can store 13930 thousand cubic meters of water. The construction of the dam was completed in 1967.

See also
List of dams in Japan

References

Dams in Kagoshima Prefecture